The Peugeot 106 is a supermini produced by French automaker Peugeot between 1991 and 2003. Launched in September 1991, it was Peugeot's entry level offering throughout its production life, and was initially sold only as a three door hatchback, with a five door hatchback joining the range in the beginning of 1992. Production ended in July 2003.

For the first year of production, the 1.0 and 1.1 petrol engines came with a carburettor, but were replaced by fuel injected engines from the end of 1992, as a result of EEC emissions regulations.

Phase I (1991–1996) 

The "10" line of Peugeot superminis had commenced in 1972 with the launch of the 104, one of the first modern European superminis. The 104 was effectively replaced by the Peugeot 205 in 1983, but remained in production for some markets until 1988. There was no "105".

The 106 was introduced as a three door hatchback in continental Europe in September 1991, and two months later in the United Kingdom. The initial engine range had 1.0, 1.1 and 1.4 petrol engines, as well as a 1.5 diesel. 

The early 1.0 and 1.1s were carburetted, but were replaced with fuel injection after a year due to EC emissions requirements.

Phase II (1996–2003)

It was updated in July 1996, with changes including the introduction of side impact bars and availability of driver and passenger airbags for the first time, with the new 1.6 GTI joining the range as the spiritual successor to the hugely popular and highly regarded 205 GTI, which had been discontinued in 1994.

In January 1996, the Peugeot 106 also formed the basis for the near identical looks and size Citroën Saxo.

The 106's successor, the Peugeot 107, along with rebadged versions, Citroën C1 and Toyota Aygo, was launched two years later in June 2005, as a joint venture with Toyota.

High performance variants

Marketed as having "fewer frills, more thrills", the Rallye version had trademark steel wheels painted white. Power steering, central locking, and electric windows were omitted to keep the weight down to 825 kilograms. 

There were pre and post facelift versions of the 106 Rallye known to enthusiasts as S1 and S2 models, with the latter having a 103bhp 1.6 litre (TU5J2) engine in place of the original high revving Rallye specific 1.3 100bhp (TU2J2) engine fitted to pre facelift cars. 

Contrary to some sources, the S1 models did not share the same engine with the 205 Rallye and AX Sport, which used a carburettor TU24 engine. The dimensions of the aluminium S1 block resemble those of the 1.4 iron block with slightly lowered capacity to comply with the rules of the lower French rally classes at the time (under 1,300 cc). The S1 (TU2J2) and S2 (TU5J2) were fuel injected, employing Magneti Marelli multi point fuel injection systems.

The S1 Rallye were designed as a homologation special to compete in the 1300 cc rally class. It featured a four cylinder, 8-valve, high compression engine with an aggressive cam profile designed to come "on song" between 5,400 and the 7,200 rpm redline. 

This engine coupled to a short ratio five speed gearbox made the 1.3 more of a sprinter than a cruiser. 70mph on the motorway was a noisy 4,000 rpm in fifth gear, but given enough tarmac, the little 1.3 would redline in top gear at 115mph. 

The 106 was competitive in racing, but also made a practical small family car. All cars had steel wheels, and Rallye decals and seat coverings featuring a one or three colour flash, which again varied between early and late cars. With facelift came new top model named Peugeot 106 GTI with 1.6 litre 16 valves engine that produce 120hp. It came with new exterior body kit and new wheels. On some markets in Europe, it was badged S16 or Rallye.

Electric version

In 1995, Peugeot launched an electric powered version of the 106, called the 106 Electrique. This was offered in a number of European countries including France, Belgium, The Netherlands, Norway and the United Kingdom.

The electric powertrain was developed and built by French engineering company Heuliez.

Despite the high price of the vehicle, Peugeot anticipated demand for around 15,000 to 20,000 Peugeot 106 Électriques each year, with an expected total production run of 100,000 vehicles. In the end, only 6,400 Peugeot 106 Électriques were sold between 1995 and 2003, most purchased by the French Administration.

Engines

Petrol Engines

Diesel Engines

Special Editions
As with most Peugeot models at the time, there were many special editions of the 106 offered between 1991 and 2003.

References

External links

2000s cars
Cars introduced in 1991
Cars discontinued in 2003
City cars
Electric car models
Front-wheel-drive vehicles
Hatchbacks
106